The , the navy of the German Empire, built a series of battlecruisers in the first half of the 20th century. The battlecruiser type was an outgrowth of older armored cruiser designs; they were intended to scout for the main battle fleet and attack the reconnaissance forces of opposing fleets. Kaiser Wilhelm II insisted that the new battlecruisers be able to fight in the line of battle with battleships to counter Germany's numerical inferiority compared to the British Royal Navy.

 was the first German battlecruiser, built in 1908–1910. The  eventually built four more battlecruisers before the start of the First World War to serve with the High Seas Fleet, and another two were completed during the conflict. Two of the Mackensens—the name ship and Graf Spee—were launched but never completed, and the other two were in earlier stages of work when they were canceled towards the end of the war. Serious work never began on the three Ersatz Yorck-class ships.

Six of the seven battlecruisers completed before or during World War I saw relatively heavy combat, primarily in the North Sea. The unit conducted several raids of the English coast between 1914 and 1916, which culminated in the Battle of Jutland during 31 May – 1 June 1916, in which they were expected to draw parts of the British fleet onto the German battleship line. The German flagship  was scuttled by her crew, on the way back to port, and the other ships were heavily damaged. The ships were interned with the bulk of the German fleet at the British naval base at Scapa Flow following the end of the war in November 1918. There, they were scuttled by their crews in 1919 to prevent them from falling into the hands of the Allied Powers. Goeben was transferred to the Ottoman Navy at the outbreak of hostilities, and operated against the Russian Black Sea Fleet for the majority of the war. She was heavily damaged by British naval mines near the end of the war, but was repaired and went on to serve the Turkish Navy until the 1950s; she was eventually broken up for scrap in the 1970s.

The outbreak of war in 1939 caused the plans to be shelved, and none of these ships were built.



SMS Von der Tann 

SMS Von der Tann was the first German battlecruiser, ordered in 1907. She was designed in response to the British s, construction on which had begun the previous year. As the first of a new type, the design process for Von der Tann was highly controversial. Admiral Alfred von Tirpitz, the State Secretary for the Imperial German Navy, wanted the ship to follow the British example, incorporating large guns, relatively light armor, and high speed. Kaiser Wilhelm II, along with other senior navy officers instead argued that, owing to Germany's numerical inferiority, the new ships should have armor strong enough to permit their use in the battle line. The ships would therefore sacrifice the caliber of their main batteries to offset the greater weight of heavier armor protection. A significant increase in speed compared to earlier armored cruisers was obtained by replacing old triple-expansion steam engines with more powerful steam turbines; Von der Tann was the first large German warship to be fitted with turbine propulsion.

Upon entering service, Von der Tann joined the fleet's main reconnaissance unit, I Scouting Group. The ship was present for most of the German fleet operations during World War I, including several raids of the English coast between 1914 and 1916. At the Battle of Jutland on 31 May – 1 June 1916, Von der Tann was the last ship in the German battlecruiser squadron. She engaged  and, after 15 minutes of firing, Von der Tann scored a hit with one of her 28 cm shells that caused a magazine explosion, destroying Indefatigable. Von der Tann was herself badly damaged in the course of the action, and had at one point had all four of her turrets disabled, but was repaired after the battle and returned to service. She saw no further action, however, as the Germans turned to the U-boat campaign against British merchant shipping after Jutland. At the end of the war, Von der Tann was interned in Scapa Flow and eventually scuttled with the rest of the fleet. She was raised in 1930 and broken up for scrap between 1931–1934.

Moltke class 

Moltke and Goeben, improvements over the preceding Von der Tann, were ordered in 1908 and 1909, respectively. While their design was not as contentious as with the Von der Tann, there were still disagreements between Tirpitz and elements of the German naval administration over whether the main battery guns should be increased in number or caliber. Tirpitz and the Construction Office favored the increase to ten guns, while the General Office preferred repeating Von der Tann but with eight  guns, to mirror the development from the contemporary  and es of dreadnought battleships. It was eventually decided that ten 28 cm guns would be mounted, though new, longer-barreled versions were adopted. The longer barrels increased muzzle velocity, which in turn offered improved armor penetration. In addition to the increased main battery, the two Moltke-class ships were slightly larger and better armored than Von der Tann.

Moltke joined Von der Tann in the battlecruiser squadron upon her commissioning, and saw action against the British in the North Sea, including the Battle of Dogger Bank in January 1915, in addition to the coastal raids carried out in the first two years of the war. The ship also saw significant duty in the Baltic Sea against the Russian navy; in 1915 she was present at the Battle of the Gulf of Riga, where she was torpedoed by a British submarine, and in 1917, she returned to the Baltic as the flagship of the invasion force that conducted Operation Albion. Moltke was also interned in Scapa Flow at the end of the war and scuttled in 1919. Goeben, on the other hand, was assigned to the Mediterranean in 1912 to serve as the flagship of the Mediterranean Division. At the outbreak of war in 1914, Goeben and the light cruiser  evaded the British fleet and escaped to Constantinople, where they were transferred to the Ottoman Navy, though they remained under German command and with their original crews. The ship primarily operated in the Black Sea against the Russians, seeing combat at the Battle of Cape Sarych and the actions of 10 May 1915 and 8 January 1916. She attacked British forces outside the Dardanelles in 1918 and struck three mines. The ship continued in Turkish service until 1973 when she was sold for scrapping.

SMS Seydlitz 

Improvements to the Moltke design were secured only through pressure Tirpitz was able to place on steel suppliers and the ship's builder for discounts, which provided the necessary budgetary room to alter the design. Tirpitz still pressed for a British-style battlecruiser with light armor and larger guns, but his views were again rejected. Seydlitz was slightly larger than the two previous ships, carried slightly thicker belt armor, and had a taller forecastle to improve seakeeping in bad weather. Seydlitz mounted the same ten 28 cm guns as in the Moltke class in the same arrangement.

Upon commissioning into the fleet, Seydlitz became the flagship of Rear Admiral Franz von Hipper, the commander of I Scouting Group. The ship took part in most of the major fleet operations during the war. By April 1916, she had been replaced as Hipper's flagship by the new battlecruiser . At Jutland, Seydlitz and  inflicted fatal damage on the British battlecruiser  early in the action. Despite the immense damage, Seydlitz was able to make the trip back to Wilhelmshaven, where she was repaired. As with Von der Tann and Moltke, Seydlitz was interned and eventually scuttled in Scapa Flow.

Derfflinger class 

The three Derfflinger-class ships were the last battlecruisers completed for the German navy. The ships' primary armament was radically modified compared to the older ships. The number of guns was reduced to eight, but their diameter was increased to 30.5 cm (12 in). They were also placed in two superfiring pairs, fore and aft of the main superstructure. The first unit, the name ship, was completed shortly after the outbreak of World War I. Lützow followed in August 1915, and Hindenburg joined the fleet in May 1917. Derfflinger was involved in most of the fleet actions during the war. At Jutland she fired on Queen Mary and contributed to her destruction, along with Seydlitz. However, during the battle, Lützow was severely damaged by at least 24 heavy-caliber shells and was unable to make it back to Germany. She was scuttled early the following morning. Hindenburgs career was much less eventful; she was completed so late in the war that she saw no significant action against the British fleet. She and Derfflinger were interned and scuttled in Scapa Flow with the rest of the fleet.

Mackensen class 

Following the realization in February 1915 that the war would not be won quickly, the Navy department decided to replace the six armored cruisers that had been lost thus far. The ships were improved versions of the Derfflinger class; the primary alterations being the adoption of the 35 cm (13.8 in) gun for the main battery, along with a full-length forecastle deck. Four ships were ordered and laid down, but only two of them, Mackensen and Graf Spee, were launched. None of the ships were completed, as work had been diverted to U-boat construction. All four ships were broken up in Germany between 1921 and 1924.

Ersatz Yorck class 

The three ships of the Ersatz Yorck class were originally ordered as Mackensen-class ships, but the design was modified in January 1917 to increase the armament to eight 38 cm (15 in) guns. The Ersatz Yorcks were otherwise similar to the Mackensens, with the exception of the funnels. The Ersatz Yorck-class ships were modified to trunk the two smoke uptakes of the previous design into one large funnel. Only the lead ship was laid down, and work did not proceed far; only about 1,000 metric tons of steel had been assembled by the time work ceased. The other two ships were assigned to shipyards, but work never began.

O class 

The O-class battlecruisers were designed in 1937 to supplement the s then planned for the new German fleet. The three ships were armed with six 38 cm guns in three twin turrets, similar to the arrangement of the main battery of the s. They were intended for use as long-range commerce raiders, with the goal of forcing Great Britain to disperse its battleships as convoy escorts. The ships were never laid down due to the outbreak of World War II in September 1939.

Footnotes

Notes

Citations

References

Further reading
 
 
 

 
Battlecruisers
Germany